2726 Kotelnikov, provisional designation , is a stony Koronian asteroid from the outer regions of the asteroid belt, approximately  in diameter. It was discovered on 22 September 1979, by Soviet astronomer Nikolai Chernykh at the Crimean Astrophysical Observatory in Nauchnij on the Crimean peninsula. The S-type asteroid has a rotation period of 4.91 hours and is a suspected binary system. The asteroid was named for Soviet scientist and pioneer in radar astronomy, Vladimir Kotelnikov.

Orbit and classification 

Kotelnikov is a member of the Koronis family, a very large family of stony asteroids with nearly co-planar ecliptical orbits, named after 158 Koronis.

It orbits the Sun in the outer main-belt at a distance of 2.6–3.1 AU once every 4 years and 10 months (1,765 days; semi-major axis of 2.86 AU). Its orbit has an eccentricity of 0.08 and an inclination of 2° with respect to the ecliptic.

The body's observation arc begins with a precovery taken at Palomar Observatory in June 1954, or 25 years prior to its official discovery observation at Nauchnij.

Physical characteristics 

Kotelnikov has been characterized as both a common S- and uncommon L-type asteroid by Pan-STARRS photometric survey, while in the SDSS-MFB (Masi Foglia Binzel) taxonomy, it is classified as a stony S-type asteroid.

Rotation period 

In October 2013, a rotational lightcurve of Kotelnikov was obtained from photometric observations in the R-band by astronomers with the Palomar Transient Factory in California. Lightcurve analysis gave a rotation period of 4.752 hours with a brightness variation of 0.26 magnitude. In March 2015, Swiss and French astronomers René Roy, Raoul Behrend and José De Queiroz measured a period of 4.9078 hours and an amplitude of 0.21 magnitude. The astronomers noted that Kotelnikov is likely a binary asteroid, yet more observations are required. The Collaborative Asteroid Lightcurve Link does not mention the asteroid's suspected binary status and consolidates a period of 4.9075 hours with an amplitude of 0.21 to 0.26.

Diameter and albedo 

According to the survey carried out by the NEOWISE mission of NASA's Wide-field Infrared Survey Explorer, Kotelnikov measures 10.937 kilometers in diameter and its surface has an albedo of 0.213, while the Collaborative Asteroid Lightcurve Link assumes an albedo of 0.24 and calculates a diameter of 9.85 kilometers based on an absolute magnitude of 12.2.

Naming 

This minor planet was named after Soviet scientist Vladimir Kotelnikov (1908–2005), who pioneered radar astronomy in the Soviet Union. He was a long-time director of the Institute of Radio-engineering and Electronics and vice-president of the former USSR Academy of Science. The official naming citation was published by the Minor Planet Center on 8 November 1984.

Notes

References

External links 
 Asteroid Lightcurve Database (LCDB), query form (info )
 Dictionary of Minor Planet Names, Google books
 Asteroids and comets rotation curves, CdR – Observatoire de Genève, Raoul Behrend
 Discovery Circumstances: Numbered Minor Planets (1)-(5000) – Minor Planet Center
 
 

002726
Discoveries by Nikolai Chernykh
Named minor planets
19790922